The information regarding List of rivers in the Los Ríos Region on this page has been compiled from the data supplied by GeoNames. It includes all features named "Rio", "Canal", "Arroyo", "Estero" and those Feature Code is associated with a stream of water. This list contains 165 water streams.

Content
This list contains:
 Name of the stream, in Spanish Language
 Coordinates are latitude and longitude of the feature in ± decimal degrees, at the mouth of the stream
 Link to a map including the Geonameid (a number which uniquely identifies a Geoname feature)
 Feature Code explained in 
 Other names for the same feature, if any
 Basin countries additional to Chile, if any

List 

  Rio El LingueRío El Lingue3891183STM(Rio El Lingue, Rio Lingua, Rio Lingue, Rio Mehuin, Río El Lingue, Río Lingua, Río Mehuin)
  Rio ValdiviaRío Valdivia3868702STM(Rio Valdivia, Río Valdivia)
  Rio CallecalleRío Callecalle3897250STM
  Rio San PedroRío San Pedro3871791STM
  Rio EncoRío Enco3890095STM
  Rio LlanquihueRío Llanquihue3882954STM
 Neltume River
 Liquiñe River
  Rio FuyFui River3889220STM
 Rio Hua HumRío Hua Hum3888614STM(Rio Guahun, Rio Guahun Norte, Rio Hua Hum, Rio Huaun, Río Guahún, Río Guahún Norte, Río Hua Hum, Río Huaun, Rio Huahum)(AR)
 Chapelco River (AR)
  Rio LipinzaRío Lipinza3883110STM
 Pullinque River
 Guanehue River
  Estero Llancahue3882992STM
  Rio Cau Cau6459019STM
  Rio CrucesRío Cruces3893256STM
  Rio PichoyRío Pichoy3876217STM
  Estero Cutipay3892809STM
  Rio Torna GaleonesRío Torna Galeones3869600STM(Tornagaleones)
  Rio AngachillaRío Angachilla3899650STM
  Rio FutaRío Futa3889227STM(Rio Fula, Rio Futa, Río Fula, Río Futa)
  Rio NaguilanRío Naguilán3879102STM
  Rio ChaihuinRío Chaihuín3895652STM
  Rio PescadoRío Pescado3876447STM(Rio Calbuco, Rio Pescado, Río Calbuco, Río Pescado)
  Rio ColunRío Colún3893983STM
 Rio BuenoRío Bueno3897808STM (Some tributaries of Bueno River flow also in Los Lagos Region)
  Rio LlollelhueRío Llollelhue3897326STM(Rio Calcurrupe, Río Calcurrupe)
  Rio CaunahueRío Caunahue3896119STM
  Rio CalcurrupeRío Calcurrupe3897326STM(Rio Calcurrupe, Río Calcurrupe)
  Rio PillanleufuRío Pillanleufu3875985STM
  Rio HueinahueRío Hueinahue3887716STM
  Rio NilahueRío Nilahue3878648STM(Rio Milahue, Rio Nilahue, Río Milahue, Río Nilahue)
  Rio ContrafuerteRío Contrafuerte3893707STM
 Los Venados
  Rio RininahueRío Riñinahue3873157STM
 Rio PilmaiquenRío Pilmaiquén3875964STM (+Los Lagos R.)
 Rio GolgolRío Golgol3888948STM(Gol-gol)(Los Lagos R.)
  Rio RahueRío Rahue3873850STM(Los Lagos R.)
  Estero Pichi Damas3876275STM(Estero Pichi Damas, Rio Damas, Río Damas)(Los Lagos R.)

 Estero QuillenEstero Quillén3874131STM
 Estero Huino-HuinoEstero Huiño-Huiño3887491STM
 Estero La Poza3884921STM

  Estero Lleco3882921STM
  Estero Venados3868503STM
  Estero PlalafquenEstero Plalafquén3875683STM
  Estero EpucoEstero Epucó3890022STM
  Estero QuechueEstero Quechué3874461STM
  Estero Llillil3882884STM
  Estero PullafquenEstero Pullafquén3874882STM
  Estero Ralicura3873837STM
  Estero Pelluco3876747STM
  Estero Bellavista3898464STM
  Estero Guallamo3888542STM(Estero Guallamo, Estero Huallame, Estero Huellame)
  Estero Nonuco3878561STM
  Rio PelchuquinRío Pelchuquin3876794STM
  Rio NanihueRío Nañihue3879040STM(Rio Manihue, Rio Nanihue, Río Mañihue, Río Nañihue)
  Rio CudicoRío Cudico3893158STM
  Rio Pille CozcozRío Pille Cozcoz3875983STM
  Rio RucapichinRío Rucapichin3872735STM
  Rio InaqueRío Iñaque3887304STM
  Rio MafilRío Máfil3881044STM(Rio Mafil, Rio Mafit, Río Mafit, Río Máfil)
  Rio PutregualRío Putregual3874547STM
  Estero Curahuche3892912STM
  Estero Calabozo3897363STM
  Estero Tambillo3870207STM
  Estero Cusilelfu3892822STM
  Rio CallumapuRío Callumapu3897225STM(Rio Callumapu, Rio Cayumapu, Río Callumapu, Río Cayumapu)
  Estero Coihueco3894389STM
  Estero Traleufu3869354STM
  Estero Malihue3880857STM(Estero Malihue, Estero Malilhue)
  Rio ManiuRío Mañiu3880695STM
  Estero Rehue3873541STM
  Estero Cuchimalal3893166STM
  Estero Noschaco3878492STM
  Rio CarrancoRío Carranco3896549STM(Rio Caranco, Rio Carranco, Río Caranco, Río Carranco)
  Estero Cuicuileufu3893084STM
  Estero Mulpun3879189STM
  Estero Traiguenleufu3869368STM
  Estero Colegual3894290STM(Estero Coleguai, Estero Colegual)
  Estero LaurenoEstero Laureño3883617STM(Estero Laurana, Estero Lauraña, Estero Laureno, Estero Laureño)
  Rio RanquintuleufuRío Ranquintuleufu3873728STM
  Estero Panqueco3877315STM
  Estero del Choco3894907STM
  Estero ConicoEstero Coñico3893768STM
  Rio HuilehuileRío Huilehuile3887550STM(Rio Huilehuil, Rio Huilehuile, Rio Huilehuilo, Río Huilehuil, Río Huilehuile, Río Huilehuilo)
  Estero Coshue3893389STM
  Estero Punco3874829STM
  Estero Legleufu3883436STM(Estero Legleufu, Estero Lleleufu)
  Rio QuinchilcaRío Quinchilca3874032STM
  Rio TrufulRío Truful3869014STM
  Rio LlecueRío Llecue3882920STM
  Estero QuillenEstero Quillén3874130STM
  Rio CollileufuRío Collileufu3894187STM
  Estero HuinahuinaEstero Huiñahuiña3887508STM(Estero Huinahuina, Estero Huinahuino, Estero Huiñahuiña, Estero Huiñahuiño)
  Rio TirinelRío Tirinel3869767STM
  Estero Machaco3881107STM
  Estero Remehue3873492STM
  Estero Rucanahue3872742STM
  Estero Chapuco3895409STM
  Rio RemehueRío Remehue3873489STM
  Estero Punahue3874831STM
  Rio PutraiquenRío Putraiquen3874554STM
  Estero Ponpongo3875457STM
  Estero Mal Paso3880808STM
  Estero Pichico3876291STM
  Estero Hirrevilo3887994STM
  Estero LipingueEstero Lipingüe3883112STM
  Estero Piedra3876150STM
  Rio Los LlanosRío Los Llanos3881914STM(Rio Los Llanos, Rio los Llanos, Río Los Llanos, Río los Llanos)
  Estero Huiti3887471STM
  Rio TrafunRío Trafún3869392STM
  Estero Lumaco3881175STM
  Estero Lumaco3881176STM
  Estero Montolo3879414STM
  Estero Paso Malo3877083STM
  Estero La Viga3883536STM
  Estero Lumaco3881174STM
  Estero Dollinco3892328STM
  Estero Radal3873867STM
  Estero Rucaquilau3872733STM
  Estero Pescado3876450STM
  Rio La JuntaRío La Junta3885538STM
  Rio MochoRío Mocho3879658STM
  Estero MaiquenEstero Maiquén3880974STM
  Rio MaihuinRío Maihuin3881002STM
  Estero CatamutunEstero Catamutún3896181STM
  Rio QuimanRío Quimán3874072STM
  Rio PilmaiquenRío Pilmaiquén3875965STM
  Rio CanileufuRío Canileufu3896906STM
  Rio CoiqueRío Coique3894343STM(Rio Coihue, Rio Coique, Río Coihue, Río Coique)
  Estero CunocunoEstero Cuñocuño3892956STM
  Rio CurinilahueRío Curinilahue3892848STM(Rio Curinilahue, Rio Curinilehue, Río Curinilahue, Río Curinilehue)
  Estero Chollinco3894879STM
  Rio CurringueRío Curringue3892831STM
  Rio HuenteleufuRío Huenteleufú3887645STM
  Rio TemaleufuRío Temaleufu3870030STM
  Estero Polcura3875531STM
  Rio PanquecoRío Panqueco3877314STM
  Estero RalitranEstero Ralitrán3873832STM(Estero Bolitran, Estero Bolitrán, Estero Palitran, Estero Ralitran, Estero Ralitrán)
  Rio IgnaoRío Ignao3887354STM(Rio Ignao, Rio Igoao, Río Ignao, Río Igoao)
  Estero Pitruco3875747STM
  Estero QuillinEstero Quillín3874127STM
  Estero Molhue3879628STM(Estero Malhue, Estero Molhue)
  Estero Mocho3879660STM
  Rio IculpeRío Iculpe3887385STM
  Estero Yolque3867640STM
  Estero Chamul3895578STM(Estero Chamul, Estero Chumu)
  Estero Huequeco3887631STM
  Rio RupameicaRío Rupameica3872681STM
  Rio PichipichoneRío Pichipichone3876228STM
  Estero Husco3887423STM
  Rio ContraRío Contra3893711STM
  Estero ChaullenEstero Chaullén3895332STM(Estero Chaullen, Estero Chaullue, Estero Chaullén)
  Rio Pichi-IculpeRío Pichi-Iculpe3876264STM
  Rio MelipueRío Melipué3880105STM
  Estero Chilcoco3895123STM
  Estero Venado3868509STM
  Rio Pichi-IgnaoRío Pichi-Ignao3876263STM
  Rio TraniRío Trani3869325STM
  Estero del Medio3880194STM
  Estero Collinco3894184STM
  Estero la Plaza3875638STM
  Estero Lumaco3881173STM
  Rio ColoradoRío Colorado3894027STM
  Estero Quebrada3874517STM
  Estero Bolsiquillo3898109STM
  Estero Overa3877910STM
  Estero Pantanoso3877287STM(Estero Pantanoso, Estero Pantaoso)
  Estero Cancagua3897007STM
  Estero La Virgen3883499STM
  Rio CholchosRío Cholchos3894892STM
  Rio BlancoRío Blanco3898208STM
  Rio ChaichahuenRío Chaichahuen3895663STM
  Rio CuyaimanRío Cuyaimán3892793STM
  Rio QuilihueRío Quilihue3874206STM
  Rio CurrileufuRío Currileufu3892832STM(Rio Curileufu, Rio Currileufu, Río Curileufu, Río Currileufu)
  Rio MuticaoRío Muticao3879135STM
  Estero Curaco3892919STM
  Estero Rinconada3873268STM
  Estero Coihueco3894388STM
  Estero Los Pasos3881632STM(Estero Los Pasos, Estero los Pazos)
  Rio MorroRío Morro3879296STM
  Rio Pichi-ChirriRío Pichi-Chirri3876298STM
  Estero Mencahue3880061STM
  Estero Treguaco3869251STM
  Rio MantilhueRío Mantilhue3880665STM
  Estero La Aguada3867498STM(Estero Aguada, Estero La Aguada)

See also
 List of lakes in Chile
 List of volcanoes in Chile
 List of islands of Chile
 List of fjords, channels, sounds and straits of Chile
 List of lighthouses in Chile

Notes

References

External links
 Rivers of Chile
 Base de Datos Hidrográfica de Chile
 

Los Rios